Gorsachius is a genus of Old World night herons typically found near water in forested regions. These are medium-sized herons which are migratory in the colder parts of their ranges, but otherwise resident. They are the least known, most strictly nocturnal, smallest and overall rarest night herons.

Three of the four species are found in East, South and South-east Asia, while the last species, the white-backed night heron, is found in sub-Saharan Africa. The Japanese and Malayan night herons resemble each other, being relatively short-billed and overall brown with a dark line from the throat to the upper belly. The larger white-eared and white-backed night herons are darker, with distinctive white markings on the face and neck in the former, and an entirely black head in the latter.

Their behavior, especially that of the white-eared night heron, is relatively poorly known compared to that of other night herons, but they nest alone or in small groups, and a clutch of two to five eggs has been recorded. While generally nocturnal and crepuscular, they have been recorded feeding during the day in clouded weather. They are skulking, and known to feed on crabs, crustacean, fish, insects, frogs and other small animals.

Taxonomy
These night herons were formerly placed in the genus Nycticorax, but today all major authorities recognize them as separate. In addition to the species listed below, the rufous or nankeen night heron has been placed in Gorsachius, but today all major authorities place it in Nycticorax. The four night herons in this genus are all monotypic.

References

 Martínez-Vilalta, A., & A. Motis (1992). Family Ardeidae (Herons). pp. 376–429 in: del Hoyo, J., A. Elliott, & J. Sargatal. eds (1992). Handbook of the Birds of the World. Vol. 1. Ostrich to Ducks. Lynx Edicions, Barcelona. 

 
Bird genera
Taxa named by Charles Lucien Bonaparte